Lanceopenna pseudogaleotis is a moth in the family Gelechiidae. It was described by Anthonie Johannes Theodorus Janse in 1950. It is found in the South African province of Gauteng.

References

Endemic moths of South Africa
Gelechiinae
Moths described in 1950